Austin Roberts (born George Austin Robertson Jr.; September 19, 1945) is an American singer and songwriter. His most successful recording was 1975's "Rocky"; a transatlantic Top 40 hit single. He also wrote several songs that featured in episodes of Scooby-Doo Where Are You! and performed the theme for season 2 of the show.

Career
Roberts was born on September 19, 1945 in Newport News, Virginia. As the lead singer of Arkade, he had two Billboard Hot 100 hits in 1970-71, including the easy listening crossover, "The Morning of Our Lives", which became the Bridal Fair theme, later a Top 15 Adult Contemporary hit, and "Sing Out the Love (In My Heart)", which reached No. 99 on the Hot 100.

Roberts performed the theme song to the second season of the animated series, Scooby-Doo, Where Are You! as well as the season 2 "chase songs", many of which he also composed.

In 1972 he sang the hit "Something's Wrong With Me", written by Danny Janssen and Bobby Hart, which reached No. 12 on the Billboard Hot 100 in 1972. "Keep on Singing", later a No. 15 single for Helen Reddy in April 1974, was another hit for Roberts, reaching No. 50 on the Hot 100 in March 1973.

"Rocky" brought his greatest success, reaching No. 9 on the Hot 100 in October 1975. The track also reached No. 22 in the UK in November 1975, which to date is Roberts' only chart appearance in the UK.

Roberts and Hart later wrote the song "Over You" for the 1983 film, Tender Mercies. "Over You" was nominated for the 1984 Academy Award for Best Original Song, as well as the Golden Globe nomination for Best Song in a Motion Picture.

In 1988, Roberts wrote the American Gymnastics Team's theme song for the Olympics, "When You Put Your Heart in It". It subsequently became a Top 20 Adult Contemporary hit for Kenny Rogers.

In 1999, Busch Gardens commissioned Roberts to write the opening song for their Williamsburg Extravaganza. Roberts has written a number of songs for soap operas as well.

Roberts also wrote music and lyrics for two musicals, Rachinoff and Damon's Song. Rachinoff, starring Rob Marshall, was performed at Carnegie Mellon in 1981. It was nominated for an ACE Award (Cable Emmy). Damon's Song, starring three Tony Award winners, was performed at Pennsylvania Stage Co. in 1979.

As a songwriter, Roberts also had No. 1 single successes with country singer Reba McEntire (You Lie) and singer Gary Morris (100% Chance of Rain).

Awards

Roberts has been nominated for four Grammy Awards, two of which he won ("I.O.U" by Lee Greenwood and "Chance of a Lifetime" by Take 6).

He also won a German award (for "Mission of Love"), four Canadian awards (for "He Would Be Sixteen" by Michelle Wright, as well as the 1993 CCMA Single of the Year), a CMA Award, an ACM Award, a Music City News Award, two NSAI Awards, and numerous ASCAP and SESAC Awards for airplay. Roberts has also been nominated for an additional CMA Award and ACM Award.

Discography

Albums
1972: Austin Roberts (Chelsea) - AUS No. 64
1973: The Last Thing On My Mind (Chelsea)
1975: Rocky (Private Stock)
1976: Eight Days: A Personal Journey (Austin Roberts & Advent) (Newpax)
1981: Paint My Life (MCA Songbird)

Soundtrack
Scooby-Doo's Snack Tracks: The Ultimate Collection

Singles
1968: "Ricky Ticky Ta Ta Ta" (Philips)
1968: "Mary and Me" (Philips)
1969: "Baltimore" (Philips)
1970: "Runaway" / "Just a Little" (Philips)
1970: "Pretty Mary Sunlight" (Philips)
1970: "One Night Ann" (Philips)
1970: "Sing Out the Love (In My Heart)" (lead vocalist for Arkade) (ABC Dunhill) - U.S. No. 99
1971: "Life Is for Living" (ABC Dunhill)
1971: "The Morning of Our Lives" (lead vocalist for Arkade) (ABC Dunhill) - U.S. No. 60
1971: "Where You Lead" (lead vocalist for Arkade) (ABC Dunhill)
1972: "Like a Rosebud" (Horizon featuring Austin Roberts) (Virgo)
1972: "Every Day in My Life with Linda" (Horizon featuring Austin Roberts) (Virgo)
1972: "Something's Wrong with Me" (Chelsea) - U.S. No. 12, AUS No. 40
1972: "Keep On Singing" (Chelsea) - U.S. No. 50, AUS #46
1973: "One Word" (Chelsea)
1973: "The Last Thing on My Mind" (Chelsea)
1974: "Something to Believe In" (Chelsea)
1974: "I'd Rather Be with You" (Chelsea)
1975: "Rocky" (Private Stock) - U.S. No. 9, UK No. 22, AUS No. 25
1975: "Children of the Rain" (Private Stock)
1976: "Just to Make You Mine" (Private Stock)
1976: "This Time I'm in It for Love" (Private Stock)
1978: "Don't Stop Me Baby (I'm On Fire)" (Arista)
1980: "In the Garden" (MCA Songbird)

References

1945 births
Living people
Musicians from Newport News, Virginia
American country singer-songwriters
American male pop singers
American male singer-songwriters
Singer-songwriters from Virginia
20th-century American singers
21st-century American singers
Philips Records artists
20th-century American male singers
21st-century American male singers
Private Stock Records artists